Diospyros nigra, the black sapote, is a species of persimmon. Common names include chocolate pudding fruit, black soapapple and (in Spanish) zapote prieto.  The tropical fruit tree is native to Mexico, Central America, and Colombia. The common name sapote refers to any soft, edible fruit. Black sapote is not related to white sapote nor mamey sapote. The genus Diospyros has numerous other fruit bearing tree species in addition to the persimmons and black sapote.

Etymology
The etymology of Diospyros is "divine fruit". It derives from the greek words "dios" and "pyron". There are multiple meanings including "God's pear", "Wheat of Zeus" and "Jove's fire".

Description
It is frost sensitive but can tolerate light frosts. Some trees bear only male flowers. Others have both male and female flowers, though some of these are self-incompatible. Fruiting takes about 3–4 years from seed and the trees are heavy bearers.

Fruit

Black sapote fruit are tomato-like and measure  in diameter, with an inedible skin that turns from olive to a deep yellow-green when ripe and a pulp which is white and inedible when unripe but assumes a flavor, color and texture often likened to chocolate pudding when ripe. Fruits usually contain seeds, up to a maximum of 12. The texture has been likened to that of a papaya. Boning (2006) describes the ripe fruit as having "the taste and consistency of chocolate pudding."

Unripe fruits are astringent, caustic, bitter, irritating, and have been used as fish poison in the Philippines.

Health 
The Black Sapote is a great sources for vitamins, fiber and potassium. In only 1 cup of black sapote there are 142 calories, 2.6g protein, 0.8g fat, 34 g carbohydrates, 360 mg potassium, 22 mg Vitamin C, and 420 IU Vitamin A. The high content of Vitamin C allows it to work as an immune booster. The Black Sapote has more than three times the amount of Vitamin C than an orange does.

There is little concern to use pesticides on the tree because it lacks insect pests.

The unripe fruit is very bitter and caustic, and can be used a poison typically for fish in the Philippines. The Philippines use the Black Sapote leaves as a blistering poultice. In Yucatan, the leaf decoction can be used as an astringent and is taken internally as a febrifuge. They can also be used against leprosy, ringworm, and other itching skin conditions.

Propagation
Propagation is usually from seed, which can retain viability for several months and require around 30 days for germination. Some trees are seedless however, and can be propagated by air-layering or shield budding.

Cultivation
Black sapote trees are normally found below 600 meters, but are not particular about soil, and can tolerate light frosts. They are sensitive to drought, requiring irrigation in dry areas, but are quite tolerant of flooding. The tree grows fairly slowly for the first 3–4 years, perhaps just 1 foot/year for the first couple of years. Later however it grows much more rapidly. Trees should be spaced 10-12m apart.

Growing requirements: full sunlight, grows best in most well drained soils (sand and lime-stone based) and high pH soils (5.5-7.0), sensitive to drought but tolerant to flooding, mature trees can tolerate 28-30 degree F temperatures and young trees can be killed at 23 degree F temperatures, and they require spacing of about 32–39 ft.

Pollination takes place by insects, but some varieties are self-incompatible, meaning they require cross pollination.

Cultivars
The range in size of tree and hairiness of leaves; size, shape, seediness, flesh color and sweetness of fruit; and time of fruiting suggest that considerable genetic variability exists. Selections have been made and propagated in the Philippines, Australia, and Florida, USA.

Seedless cultivars exist, such as 'Cuevas'.

Australian cultivars
'Bernicker' (also 'Bernecker') is a prolific producer of nearly spherical, medium to large fruit with few seeds and of superior quality.

'Mossman' has very large, round fruit of medium flavor with high pulp content and few seeds, and is capable of producing up to 450 kg per tree.

'Maher' has very large, flattened fruit of good to very good quality with few seeds. It is uniquely known among cultivars for being a small, yet prolific tree (up to 4 meters).

'Ricks Late' originated in NSW Australia and produces heavy, late crops with excellent quality.

'Superb' is a selection from North Queensland that bears large quantities of superb quality, small fruits that may be completely seedless if not cross pollinated.

'Cocktail' is described as having excellent flavor.

Florida cultivars
'Mérida' (also 'Reineke' or 'Reinecke') is named after the origin of its seed. It produces 70 kg or more of very sweet, small to medium-sized fruit of very good quality with 5-10 seeds, beginning 6–8 weeks earlier than other varieties (November in Florida).

Philippine cultivars
'Manilla' and 'Valesca' have few seeds.

See also
The unrelated fruits, mamey sapote (Sapotaceae) and the white sapote (Rutaceae).
List of culinary fruits

References

External links

Australian Tropical Fruits- Chocolate Pudding Fruit

nigra
Tropical fruit
Trees of Central America
Trees of Colombia
Trees of Mexico
Crops originating from Mexico
Fruit trees